GUC may refer to:

People 
 Ezgi Güç (born 1992), Turkish volleyball player
 Volkan Güç (born 1980), Turkish volleyball player

Other uses 

 Gallant Unit Citation, of the United States Air Force
 Garissa University College, in Kenya
 Global Unichip Corporation, a Taiwanese ASIC designer
 German University in Cairo, in Egypt
 Godalming United Church, in England
 Grace Universalist Church, in Lowell, Massachusetts, United States
 Grand Union Canal, in England
 Growing Up Coy, a 2016 American documentary
 Growing Up Creepie, a Canadian-American animated television series
 Gunnison–Crested Butte Regional Airport, in Colorado, United States
 a codon for the amino acid valine
 Wayuu language, spoken in Colombia and Venezuela